Denis Coffey (born 1983) is an Irish hurler who played as a right corner-back for the Waterford senior team.

Coffey joined the team during the 2004 National League and was a semi-regular member of the team until after the 2008. During that time he won Munster medals and one National League medal as a non-playing substitute.

At club level Coffey is a dual player with the Sliabh gCua–St Mary's club.

Playing career

Club

Coffey plays his club hurling with the St Mary's club while he also plays Gaelic football with the Sliabh gCua club.

In 2011 he won a junior football championship medal with Sliabh gCua.

Inter-county

Coffey first came to prominence on the inter-county scene as a member of the Waterford minor hurling team in 2001. He enjoyed little success in this grade.

Coffey made his senior debut for Waterford in a National League game against Laois in 2004. He played a number of games during that campaign; however, he played no part in Waterford's successful Munster campaign later that season.

In 2007 he won a National League medal as a non-playing substitute when Waterford defeated Kilkenny by 0-20 to 0-18 in the final.

The following year Coffey was an unused substitute as Waterford faced a heavy 3-30 to 1-13 defeat by Kilkenny in the All-Ireland final.

References

1983 births
Living people
St Mary's (Waterford) hurlers
Sliabh gCua Gaelic footballers
Waterford inter-county hurlers